Golden Acre Park is a public park in Bramhope, Leeds, West Yorkshire, England, administered by Leeds City Council.

History
The park opened as a privately run amusement park in 1932 with a miniature railway, swimming pool and boating lake, but closed during the Second World War and was taken over by the Council in 1945. The lake was formed by damming Adel Beck and was larger than at present.

Location
The park is on the east side of the A660 road.  On the west side is a car park and Breary Marsh nature reserve, with a pedestrian tunnel under the road joining them to the main park. The Leeds Country Way passes through the park, and the Meanwood Valley Trail links the park to Woodhouse Moor.

Attractions and facilities
The park has a lake with wildfowl, informal gardens, demonstration gardens, a special collection of heathers, and woodland and open spaces. The gardens contain the National Plant Collections of Lilac, Deutzia, Hosta and Hemerocallis.

Facilities include a cafe (with indoor and outdoor seating), a number of benches, a bird feeding shelter and numerous picnic benches. The park is usually well kept all year round.

The Adel Dam nature reserve, owned by the Yorkshire Wildlife Trust, is adjacent to the eastern side of the park.

Gallery

References

External links
VRLeeds map and panoramic views of the park photographed in 2009
Leeds City Council page about Golden Acre Park

Parks and commons in Leeds
Gardens in West Yorkshire
Leeds Blue Plaques